The 1978 North Texas State Mean Green football team represented North Texas State University—now known as the University of North Texas—during the 1978 NCAA Division I-A football season. In its sixth and final season under head coach Hayden Fry, the team compiled a 9–2 record. The team played its home games at Fouts Field in Denton, Texas.

Schedule

FB #28 Kevin Adkisson

Game summaries

Mississippi State

Oklahoma State

at Texas

Team players in the 1979 NFL Draft

References

North Texas State
North Texas Mean Green football seasons
North Texas State Mean Green football